In the 2015 FIFA Women's World Cup qualification process, one spot was allocated to the winner of a two-legged play-off between the fourth-placed team from CONCACAF and the third-placed team from CONMEBOL.

Qualified teams

Summary
The draw for the order of legs was held in Zürich on 22 July 2014. Ecuador hosted the first leg on 8 November 2014, and Trinidad and Tobago hosted the second leg on 2 December 2014.
|}

Matches

Ecuador won 1–0 on aggregate and qualified for 2015 FIFA Women's World Cup.

Goalscorers

References

External links
FIFA website

Play-off
2014 in Ecuadorian football
2014 in Ecuadorian women's sport
2014–15 in Trinidad and Tobago football
Ecuador women's national football team matches
Trinidad and Tobago women's national football team matches
2015
2015
November 2014 sports events in South America
November 2014 sports events in North America